The Cossacks is a 1961 Soviet drama film directed by Vasili Pronin. It was entered into the 1961 Cannes Film Festival. It is based on the novel of the same name.

Cast
 Leonid Gubanov - Dmitri Olenin
 Boris Andreyev - Eroshka
 Zinaida Kiriyenko - Maryana
 Eduard Bredun - Lukashka
 Boris Novikov - Nazarka
 Vera Yenyutina
 Konstantin Gradopolov
 German Kachin - Vanyusha
 I. Men - Ustenka
 Vsevolod Safonov
 Aleksandra Danilova
 Artur Nishchenkin
 Leonid Parkhomenko
 Ivan Lyubeznov
 Anatoli Papanov

References

External links
 
 

1961 films
1960s Russian-language films
1961 drama films
Mosfilm films
Soviet drama films